Hard Rock Live, formerly known as Etess Arena,  is a multi-purpose arena in Atlantic City, New Jersey located at the Hard Rock Hotel & Casino Atlantic City. Originally opening in April 1990 as a part of the Trump Taj Mahal, the arena seats over 5,000 for music and sporting events.

About
The arena was named after Mark Grossinger Etess, a former president and COO of Trump Plaza, who perished in an October 1989 helicopter crash.

Despite the Indian theme of the Trump Taj Mahal, the Etess Arena was contemporary, based upon the club scene in England.

The venue's first concert performance was by Elton John on May 18, 1990. Donald Trump was originally in negotiations to have Madonna open the venue during her Blond Ambition World Tour but plans fell through. Her first concert in Atlantic City came 16 years later with her Confessions Tour, which was held at the Boardwalk Hall.

As part of the hotel casino complex's sale to the Seminole Tribe of Florida which rebuilt it as the Hard Rock Hotel & Casino Atlantic City, it reopened on June 29, 2018. Boxing and mixed martial arts matches are held in the arena.

Noted performers

Aerosmith
Alan Jackson
Alice in Chains
Alicia Keys
The Allman Brothers Band
Backstreet Boys
Barry Manilow
Beyoncé
Bob Dylan
The Brian Setzer Orchestra
Britney Spears
Celine Dion
Christina Aguilera
Crosby, Stills & Nash
Culture Club
Daughtry
Dave Chappelle
Diana Ross
Donna Summer
The Doobie Brothers
Earth, Wind & Fire
Elton John
Fleetwood Mac
Frankie Beverly and Maze
Guns N' Roses
Hall and Oates
Heart
Hilary Duff
James Taylor
Janet Jackson
Jennifer Lopez
The Jonas Brothers
K-Ci & JoJo
KC and the Sunshine Band
Kid Rock
KISS
Laura Pausini
Limp Bizkit
Lionel Richie
Little Richard
Luis Miguel
Luther Vandross
Marc Anthony
Mariah Carey
Martina McBride
Michael Bolton
Michael Crawford
The Moody Blues
Natalie Cole
Nickelback
Paramore
Phil Collins
Ratdog
Ringo Starr & His All-Starr Band
Rush
Salt-n-Pepa
Santana
Sarah Brightman
Sarah McLachlan
Shakira
Shirley Bassey
Simon & Garfunkel
Steve Winwood
Stevie Nicks
Stevie Wonder
Sting
Village People
Tina Turner
Van Halen
Yes

References

Buildings and structures in Atlantic City, New Jersey
Boxing venues in Atlantic City, New Jersey
Mixed martial arts venues in New Jersey
Music venues in New Jersey
Indoor arenas in New Jersey
Tourist attractions in Atlantic County, New Jersey
1990 establishments in New Jersey
Sports venues completed in 1990
2016 disestablishments in New Jersey